Freight Australia was an Australian railway company that purchased the V/Line Freight business from the Government of Victoria in 1999. Initially known as Freight Victoria, it operated rail freight services and controlled non-urban rail track in the state of Victoria, later expanding into freight haulage in other states. Freight Australia was sold to Pacific National in August 2004.

Background

V/Line formerly had a freight division, known as V/Line Freight. Under the Kennett State Government, V/Line was split into two separate entities on 1 July 1997: V/Line Passenger and V/Line Freight, with separate management to each other in preparation for privatisation. When V/Line was privatised in 1999, the passenger and freight divisions were sold separately.

History

Inception
The company was formed in March 1999 when the Freight Victoria consortium was announced by the Victorian State Government as the successful bidder for the state owned V/Line Freight business. The consortium consisted of RailAmerica, Fluor Daniel, Macquarie Bank and A Goninan & Co.

The sale included 107 locomotives and more than 2,800 freight wagons, maintenance centres at South Dynon, Geelong, Portland and Wodonga, as well as a 45-year lease (in renewable 15-year leases) on 4,756 km of broad gauge intrastate track in regional Victoria. A green and yellow livery was adopted for rolling stock. The company commenced operations on 1 May 1999.

Expansion
Regular broad gauge trains in Victoria carried logs sourced from Gippsland, paper products from Maryvale, gravel from Kilmore East, as well as general freight to and from Wodonga, Tocumwal, Shepparton, Swan Hill, Bendigo, Boort, Echuca, Deniliquin, Mildura, Warrnambool and Geelong. Grain trains also operated throughout the state as required. Freight Victoria also operated standard gauge trains in Victoria to Wodonga and Dimboola.

Freight Victoria soon begun gaining contracts outside Victoria, taking advantage of open access regimes. In October 1999, it began hauling logs from Queanbeyan to Port Kembla and in December 1999 from Wallerawang.

In March 2000, the company was renamed Freight Australia. In April 2000, Freight Australia began hauling export grain from southern New South Wales to Melbourne and Port Kembla. In October 2000, it commenced hauling SCT Logistics services from Melbourne to Perth.

Further interstate contracts followed:
Fuel: from the Clyde Refinery to West Tamworth, Dubbo, and Canberra
Domestic grain: from throughout NSW to Weston Milling, Enfield from 2002
Export grain: from the NSW Riverina district to Port Kembla, or Appleton Dock, Melbourne
Friskies: grain transported to a pet food processing plant in Blayney, from the central-west of NSW.
Logs: spasmodic traffic from Canberra to Port Kembla
Cement: Berrima to Melbourne

Demise
In October 2003, Freight Australia was put up for sale. The Australian Competition & Consumer Commission (ACCC) looked at the sale, fearing that Pacific National would create a rail and freight monopoly if it won control of the operator. At the time, other potential buyers included Australian Railroad Group, Queensland Rail, and merchant bank Babcock & Brown.

In March 2004, RailAmerica announced it had agreed terms with Pacific National to sell the business subject to government and regulatory approval. In July 2004, the ACCC announced it would not oppose the acquisition, and in August 2004, the Victorian Government approved the transfer of the Freight Australia infrastructure lease to Pacific National. Very little of the freight that FA hauled remains with PN, most of it going to road with a small amount going to other rail operators. Contracts lost to other operators include the Berrima Cement service (QUBE), the Deniliquin Rice (QUBE), the Maryvale Paper (QUBE) Allied Mills and Emerald Grain (SSR) and the Apex Quarry service (QUBE).

Fleet
Included in the purchase of V/Line Freight were 107 diesel locomotives and more than 2,800 freight wagons, which had been owned and operated by the Victorian Railways and their successors. The newest and most powerful locomotives were the 3,300 hp G class delivered from 1984, but other locomotives dated as far back as the 1950s.

With traffic growing Freight Victoria decided to replace the prime movers in number of the G class, increasing the power output to 3,800 hp. The older X class diesels also saw a more extensive power upgrade program, being stripped to the frame and rebuilt as the XR class. The company only purchased a single new locomotive, V544 which was built new in 2002 to replace two written off G class locomotives. Additional rollingstock was also acquired, including new 100 tonne capacity grain hoppers built by Alstom at the Ballarat North Workshops, second-hand grain hoppers from FreightCorp, and the conversion of surplus vans into log and container flats.

To fulfill a contractual condition with customer CRT Group that if Freight Australia was acquired by a competitor of CRT Group,  of locomotive power (calculated by the business CRT Group was offering Freight Australia) was to be transferred to them, two G and two X class locomotives were transferred to CRT Group. The balance of the fleet was included in the sale to Pacific National.

Fleet Table

References

Defunct railway companies of Australia
Interstate rail in Australia
RailAmerica
Railway companies established in 1999
Railway companies disestablished in 2004
1999 establishments in Australia
2004 disestablishments in Australia